The 2019 NCAA Division III baseball tournament will be played at the end of the 2019 NCAA Division III baseball season to determine the 44th national champion of college baseball at the NCAA Division III (D-III) level.  The tournament will conclude with eight teams competing at Perfect Game Field at Veterans Memorial Stadium in Cedar Rapids, Iowa for the championship. Eight regional tournaments will be held to determine the participants in the World Series.

This will be the first year in which the regional tournaments will be contested in a "Super Regional" format, mirroring the Division I and II tournaments. Each "Super Regional" will be split into two regionals, 13 consisting of four teams to be contested in double-elimination format, with the other 3 consisting of 2 teams to be contested in a best-of-five format, for a total of 58 teams in the tournament. The regionals will be followed by the "Super Regional" round, which will be contested as a best-of-three series between the two regional winners for the spot in the D-III World Series.

This will be the first D-III World Series contested at Veterans Memorial Stadium in Cedar Rapids, Iowa, which won the hosting rights for the D-III World Series from 2019 to 2022. The event will be hosted by the American Rivers Conference, which was known as the Iowa Intercollegiate Athletic Conference when hosting rights were awarded in 2017.

Bids

Regionals and Super Regionals

Bold indicates winner.

Orange Super Regional

Dallas Super Regional
Hosted by Misericordia University at Tambur Field

River Forest Super Regional

Boston Super Regional

Babson Park Super Regional
Hosted by Babson College at Govoni Field

Baltimore Super Regional

Birmingham Super Regional

Tiffin Super Regional
Hosted by Heidelberg University at Peaceful Valley

College World Series
Perfect Game Field at Veterans Memorial Stadium-Cedar Rapids, IA (Host: American Rivers Conference) Final game was June 4.

References

NCAA Division III Baseball Tournament
Tournament
NCAA Division III baseball tournament